Didihat District is newly proposed district to split Pithoragarh district in the state of Uttarakhand, India. Its area is 801 km2 and population is 163,196

Tehsils
Didihat
Dharchula
Munsiari
Thal
Bangapani

Blocks
Three

References

Proposed districts of Uttarakhand